Talavera may refer to:

Battles

 Battle of Talavera de la Reina, Spain, an 1809 battle of the Peninsular War
 Battle of Talavera de la Reina (1936), during the Spanish Civil War

People
 Talavera (surname), list of people with this name
 Talavera Vernon Anson (1809–1895), Royal Navy Admiral

Places
 Talavera District, a district in Andahuaylas, Peru
 Talavera, Nueva Ecija, a municipality in Nueva Ecija, Philippines

Spain
 Talavera de la Reina, a municipality of the province of Toledo, Castilla–La Mancha
 Talavera la Nueva, an EATIM part of the municipality of Talavera de la Reina
 Talavera la Real, a municipality in Badajoz, Extremadura
 Talavera, Lleida, a municipality in Segarra, Catalonia

Sports
 Talavera CF, an association football club based in Talavera de la Reina, active 1948–2010
 Talavera FS, a futsal club based in Talavera de la Reina, founded 1990
 UD Talavera, an association football club based in Talavera de la Reina, founded 1993

Other uses
 HMS Talavera (1818), a Royal Navy ship in service 1818–1840
 Talavera (gymnastics), a balance beam move named after Tracee Talavera
 Talavera pottery, a type of Mexican pottery
 Talavera Regiment or talaveras, a Spanish unit involved in the Battle of Rancagua
 Talavera (spider), a genus of jumping spiders